Abdullah Al-Shanqiti (born 22 December 1998) is a Saudi Arabian professional footballer who plays as a defender for Pro League side Al-Khaleej.

Career
Al-Shanqiti started his career at the youth team of Al-Ansar and represented the club at every level. On 18 July 2020, Al-Shanqiti joined Al-Nassr from Al-Ansar for a reported fee of SAR 1 million and signed a three-year contract with the club. On 7 August 2021, Al-Shanqiti joined Al-Raed on loan. On 17 September 2021, Al-Shanqiti made his professional debut for Al-Raed against Al-Taawoun in the Pro League, replacing Karim El Berkaoui. On 27 July 2022, Al-Shanqiti joined Al-Khaleej on a two-year deal.

References

External links
 
 

1998 births
Living people
Association football defenders
Saudi Arabian footballers
Saudi Arabia youth international footballers
Al-Ansar FC (Medina) players
Al Nassr FC players
Al-Raed FC players
Khaleej FC players
Saudi Second Division players
Saudi First Division League players
Saudi Professional League players